Kid Blue is a 1973 American Comedy Western film directed by James Frawley and starring Dennis Hopper, Warren Oates, Peter Boyle and Ben Johnson.

Plot
Bickford Waner, who has failed as a train robber, decides to go straight and get an honest job. He arrives in Dime Box, Texas, to find work. He is befriended by Reese Ford and his wife Molly. Molly seduces Bickford into getting her pregnant and making her husband miserable.

Bickford's former girlfriend Janet Conforto tracks him down and reveals to Reese and Molly that Bickford is a train robber known as Kid Blue. Bickford returns to his old ways and plots a crime.

Cast
 Dennis Hopper as Bickford Waner 
 Warren Oates as Reese Ford 
 Peter Boyle as Preacher Bob
 Ben Johnson as Sheriff "Mean John" Simpson 
 Lee Purcell as Molly Ford 
 Janice Rule as Janet Conforto 
 Ralph Waite as Drummer 
 Clifton James as Mr. Hendricks
 Jose Torvay as Old Coyote
 Mary Jackson as Mrs. Evans 
 Jay Varela as Mendoza
 Claude Ennis Starrett Jr. as Tough Guy
 Warren Finnerty as Wills 
 Owen Orr as Train Robber #1
 Richard Rust as Train Robber #2
 Howard Hessman as Confectionary Man
 M. Emmet Walsh as The Barber
 Bobby Hall as The Bartender
 Melvin Stewart as Blackman
 Eddy Donno as Huey

See also
 List of American films of 1973

References

External links

1973 films
American Western (genre) comedy films
Films set in Texas
Films directed by James Frawley
1970s Western (genre) comedy films
1973 comedy films
1970s English-language films
1970s American films